Special Metals Corporation (SMC) is an American supplier of special refractory alloys and is headquartered in New Hartford, New York, United States. The company has operations in Huntington, West Virginia; Dunkirk, New York; Burnaugh, Kentucky; Elkhart, Indiana and Hereford, England.
 
SMC's trademarks include Inconel, Incoloy, Monel, Nimonic, and Udimet.

History
"In 1952, a predecessor of Special Metals pioneered the melting technology that led to the practical development of the superalloys that are the critical materials used in the 'hot' section of modern jet engines."

At year end of 1996, SMC had "45 million pounds of vacuum induction melting capacity", 590 employees, was incorporated in Delaware and was managed by Don Muzyka.

SMC acquired Inco Alloys International from Inco in 1998 at the same time as it sold US$125 million of preferred stock to Titanium Metals Corporation. 

In 2006, Special Metals was acquired by Precision Castparts Corporation of Portland, Oregon, US.

In January 2016, SMC became a subsidiary of a subsidiary of Berkshire Hathaway when the latter acquired Precision Castparts.

References

External links 
 
 Special Metals Wiggin—official UK website

Nickel
Nickel alloys
Metal companies of the United States
Manufacturing companies based in West Virginia
Manufacturing companies based in New York (state)
2006 mergers and acquisitions
Berkshire Hathaway
American corporate subsidiaries